Kahakatchchi Patabandige Jayananda Warnaweera (born 23 November 1960) is a former Sri Lankan cricketer who played in 10 Test matches and six One Day Internationals from 1986 to 1994.

Cricket career
Warnaweera made his international debut in Pakistan's 1986 tour of Sri Lanka, playing in the first test at Kandy. His first and only wicket was Ramiz Raja, as he finished with 1/26 in Pakistan's sole innings. The 1990 domestic first class season was a particularly good one for Warnaweera; playing for Galle, he led the wicket-taking tables with 71 - 28 more than any other bowler - in the Lakspray Trophy, at an average of just 13.47 each. He also achieved his career best figures in first class cricket during the course of this season, with 13/147 in the match against Burgher Recreation Club, and 7/16 in the second innings of the match against Air Force.

Following his leading performance in domestic cricket in 1990, his second test appearance came in November 1990, when he was part of the Sri Lankan side which travelled to India. In the only test, he bowled a marathon 46 overs in India's innings, taking 3/90 with no fewer than 17 maidens. Later the same season, he was part of the Sri Lankan side for the first test against New Zealand, but was unsuccessful, finishing with match figures of 0/89, and did not play in the other two tests. He was recalled to the side later that year, playing both test matches in New Zealand's tour of Sri Lanka, and was the series' leading wicket taker, with 9 at an average of 23.22 each. He took 8 wickets in England's sole test in Sri Lanka in March 1993, playing a significant role in Sri Lanka's victory.

He played in all three test matches in the July/ August 1993 Indian tour of Sri Lanka. After the first test was washed out, he took 6/248 in the other two matches, also achieving his test high score of 20 in the second test in Colombo. His final international appearance came in August 1994, against Pakistan, and took 3 wickets in the first innings, and two more in the second innings.

After retirement
Warnaweera served as the chief curator of the Galle International Cricket Stadium, until suspended for three years by the ICC for failing to cooperate with the Anti-Corruption Unit (ACU) in an investigation.

References

1960 births
Living people
Sri Lanka Test cricketers
Sri Lanka One Day International cricketers
Jayananda Warnaweera
Alumni of Mahinda College
Ruhuna cricketers
Cricketers from Galle